USS Sentinel (SP-180) was the first United States Navy vessel to bear the name. It was a motorboat built in 1917 by Pacific Shipyards and Ways Co., Alameda, California and was purchased by the United States Navy from W. G. Tibbetts on 9 August 1917 and commissioned the same day.

World War I Operations 
Sentinel operated in San Francisco Bay during and after World War I, patrolling the harbor entrance and assisting small vessels.

Decommissioning 
She was decommissioned on 20 March 1919, transferred to the United States Coast Guard on 18 September 1919, and renamed Tulare. She was again renamed AB-14 on 6 November 1923, and remained in service until 1934.

References

External links

Motorboats of the United States Navy
Patrol vessels of the United States Navy
World War I patrol vessels of the United States
Ships built in Alameda, California
1917 ships